Helauchha is a Neighborhood (formerly a VDC) in Bhojpur Municipality of Bhojpur District in the Province No. 1 of eastern Nepal. At the time of the 1991 Nepal census it had a population of 4,034 persons living in 725 individual households.

References

External links
UN map of the municipalities of Bhojpur District

Populated places in Bhojpur District, Nepal
Bhojpur Municipality